The Noctuinae are a subfamily of the family Noctuidae, and is composed of moths. The larvae of many species feed on roots or stems of various grasses. Some are generalist feeders which makes them potential pests.

Noctuid systematics is in a state of flux; the list of tribes is provisional and other groups now considered more distinct (e.g. Hadeninae) were formerly included here. Likewise, the validity of the tribe Xestiini is doubtful for example.

See also
 List of Noctuinae genera

References